Mountain View Farm, also known as Pioneer Farms, is a historic home and farm complex located near Lexington, Rockbridge County, Virginia. The main house was built in 1854, and is a two-story, three-bay, brick dwelling, with a -story gabled kitchen and servant's wing, and one-story front and back porches.  It features a Greek Revival style interior and has a standing seam metal hipped roof. The property includes an additional 13 contributing buildings and 3 contributing structures loosely grouped into a domestic complex and two agricultural complexes.  They include a two-story, frame spring house / wash house, a frame meathouse, a one-room brick building that probably served as a secondary dwelling, a double-crib log barn, a large multi-use frame barn, a slatted corn crib with side and central wagon bays and a large granary.

It was listed on the National Register of Historic Places in 2000.

References

Houses on the National Register of Historic Places in Virginia
Greek Revival houses in Virginia
Houses completed in 1854
Houses in Rockbridge County, Virginia
National Register of Historic Places in Rockbridge County, Virginia
1854 establishments in Virginia